Night Football may refer to:

 Sunday Night Football (disambiguation)
 Monday Night Football (disambiguation)
 Thursday Night Football, National Football League (NFL) games that broadcast primarily on Thursday nights
 Friday Night Football (disambiguation)
 Saturday Night Football (disambiguation)

See also 
 Football Night in America, an American pre-game show that is broadcast on NBC